Nureddin may refer to:
Nur al-Din, a given name
Nureddin, Iran, a village in Razavi Khorasan Province, Iran